Khodro Kaveer is an automobile company based in Yazd, Iran. Established in 2001, it makes BMC and Cumitas cars.

Kaveer Automotive Industrial Corporation (in ), also known as Khodro Kaveer, is an Automotive Company headquartered in Ardakan. Khodro Kaveer was established in 2001, to assemble and produce BMCs under license for the Iranian market. The CEO of Khodro Kaveer is Masoud Haratifar, predecessor of whom was Mohammad Reza Soroush.

References

External links
Khodro Kaveer Official Website
car purchase
List of products

Car manufacturers of Iran
Vehicle manufacturing companies established in 2001
2001 establishments in Iran
Iranian brands